The General Directory of War and Finance (or General Directory, General-Ober-Finanz-Kriegs-und Domainen-Direktorium), established in 1723, was an administrative body of the government of the Kingdom of Prussia. It was the result of the merger between two rival institutions: the General Finance Directory and the General Commissariat.

Its powers included the ability to manage taxation, the economy, and administration of the provinces giving the appearance of placing the administration of government under the control of the military.

References

Clark, Gregory. Iron Kingdom: The Rise and Downfall of Prussia, 1600-1947. Cambridge, MA: Belknap Press, 2006. 

Government of Prussia
1723 establishments in the Holy Roman Empire
1808 disestablishments in Germany
Subdivisions of Prussia